Aquarius, in comics, may refer to:

 Aquarius (Marvel Comics), a Marvel Comics character
 Aquarius (DC Comics), a DC Comics villain